"Higher" is a song by American producer DJ Khaled featuring American rapper Nipsey Hussle and American singer John Legend, released as the third single from DJ Khaled's album Father of Asahd on May 17, 2019. The music video was filmed before Hussle's death on March 31, 2019. Legend plays piano on the track and sings its chorus. DJ Khaled announced that all proceeds from sales of the song will go to the rapper's children. Complex magazine ranked Hussle's verse on the song as the best on the album. The song received a Grammy award for Best Rap/Sung Performance at the 62nd Grammy Awards, marking DJ Khaled's first Grammy win and Hussle's second of the night.

Background
DJ Khaled called the song's creation part of an "emotional journey", saying Nipsey Hussle "shared his energy and positivity" with him before his death. The pair went out to lunch together and Khaled played Hussle the beat of the song. He left to give Hussle some "space", then came back in to find him writing lyrics.

In a post shared to social media, DJ Khaled revealed that profits from sales of the song will be given to Nipsey Hussle's son and daughter. He also said that the title "reminds us that vibrating on a 'Higher' level was the essence of Nipsey's soul".

Music video
The music video was released at midnight EST on May 17, 2019. TMZ previously shared a clip of the track, which showed "Legend on the keys and Nipsey rhyming next to a pair of low-rider convertibles bouncing in the air".

Charts

Certifications

References

2019 songs
DJ Khaled songs
Nipsey Hussle songs
John Legend songs
Songs written by John Legend
Songs written by DJ Khaled
Songs written by Kevin Cossom
Songs written by Nipsey Hussle